Anthony McShane (28 February 1927 – 24 December 2012) was a Northern Irish footballer and manager who played in the Football League for Plymouth Argyle and Swindon Town. After his playing career, McShane had spells as manager of Scunthorpe United and Chesterfield.

References

External links
 Tony McShane stats at Neil Brown stat site

English Football League players
1927 births
2012 deaths
Brantwood F.C. players
Plymouth Argyle F.C. players
Swindon Town F.C. players
Goole Town F.C. players
Goole Town F.C. managers
Scunthorpe United F.C. managers
Chesterfield F.C. managers
Association football wing halves
Association footballers from Northern Ireland
Football managers from Northern Ireland